Master and Man was a play by the British playwright George R. Sims first performed in 1890. The play lasted for less than two weeks on Broadway.

Adaptations
The play was adapted into film three times, as a 1915 silent film directed by Percy Nash, a 1929 silent film directed by George A. Cooper and a 1934 film directed by John Harlow.

References

Bibliography
 Bordman, Gerald Martin. American theatre: a chronicle of comedy and drama, 1869-1914. Oxford University Press, 1994.

1890 plays
British plays adapted into films